Acetyltributylcitrate is an organic compound that is used as a plasticizer. As such, it is a potential replacement of DEHP and DINP. It is a colorless liquid that is soluble in organic solvents. It is found in nail polish and other cosmetics. It is prepared by acetylation of tributylcitrate.

References

Carboxylate esters
Excipients
Plasticizers